The Instituto Español Juan Ramón Jimenez (IEJRZ;) is a Spanish international school in Casablanca, Morocco, operated by the Spanish Ministry of Education.   It is named after the Spanish poet Juan Ramón Jiménez.

History and operations
Created by decree #2747/1967 of 16 November 1967, the school occupies a building which opened on 2 May 1972. It serves levels educación infantil until bachillerato.

, 65 percent of the students were Moroccans, 30 percent were Spanish, and less than 5 percent were other nationalities.

See also

 Education in Morocco
 List of international schools
 List of schools in Morocco

References

External links
 Instituto Español Juan Ramón Jiménez 

1960s establishments in Morocco
1967 establishments in Africa
Educational institutions established in 1967
Elementary and primary schools in Morocco
International high schools
International schools in Casablanca
Spanish international schools in Morocco
High schools and secondary schools in Morocco
20th-century architecture in Morocco